Carly is a commune in the Pas-de-Calais department in the Hauts-de-France region of France.

Geography
The commune is at the junction of the D52 and the D239 roads, by the banks of the Liane river. The D901 (formerly the N1—the old Calais–Paris main highway) passes through the north of the commune.

Population

Places of interest
 The church of St.Martin, dating from the thirteenth century.
 An old manorhouse.
 The chateau d’Houret.

See also
Communes of the Pas-de-Calais department

References

Communes of Pas-de-Calais